Treleaven is a surname. Notable people with the surname include:

Dick Treleaven (born 1934), Canadian politician
Freeman Ferrier Treleaven (1884–1952), Canadian lawyer and politician
Ross Treleaven (1907–1994), Australian rules footballer 
Scott Treleaven, Canadian artist and filmmaker